Between Friends may refer to:

Film and television
 Between Friends (1924 film), an American film starring Norman Kerry
 Between Friends (1973 film), a Canadian film directed by Donald Shebib
 Between Friends (1983 film), an American-Canadian TV film starring Elizabeth Taylor
 "Between Friends" (Animorphs), an episode of the TV series Animorphs

Music
 Between Friends (Randy Napoleon album), 2006
 Between Friends (Tamia album), 2006
 "Between Friends", a song by Captain Murphy from Duality
 Between Friends (music group), an American music group

Other uses 
 Between Friends, a 2012 collection of stories by Amos Oz
 Between Friends (comics), a syndicated comic strip by Sandra Bell-Lundy

See also
 Just Between Friends (disambiguation)